Australina pusilla, the small shade nettle, is a species of flowering plant in the family Urticaceae, native to eastern Australia, and New Zealand. A highly variable perennial herb reaching , it is often found growing alongside shady streams.

Subtaxa
The following subspecies are accepted:
Australina pusilla subsp. muelleri  – Queensland, New South Wales, Victoria, Tasmania
Australina pusilla subsp. pusilla – New South Wales, Victoria, Tasmania, North Island, South Island

References

Urticaceae
Flora of Queensland
Flora of New South Wales
Flora of Victoria (Australia)
Flora of Tasmania
Flora of the North Island
Flora of the South Island
Plants described in 1830